Gordon John Brooks (11 September 1950 – 1 October 2020) was a Canadian professional ice hockey right winger who played parts of three seasons in the National Hockey League (NHL) for the St. Louis Blues and Washington Capitals.

Personal life
Brooks was born on 11 September 1950, in Cobourg, Ontario. He died on 1 October 2020, at University Hospital, London, Ontario, aged 70.

Playing career
Drafted in 1970 by the St. Louis Blues, Brooks played 32 games with the Blues before being left exposed for the 1974 NHL Expansion Draft, where he was claimed by the Washington Capitals. Brooks played 38 games during the Capitals' inaugural season before returning to play in the minors where he retired following the 1983–84 season.

Awards
 NAHL Second All-Star Team (1976–77)
 AHL First All-Star Team (1977–78)
 John B. Sollenberger Trophy (AHL Leading Scorer) (1977–78) (tied with Rick Adduono)
 IHL First All-Star Team (1981–82)

References

External links
 
 Gord Brooks' profile at Hockey Draft Central

1950 births
2020 deaths
Canadian ice hockey right wingers
Denver Spurs players
Fort Worth Wings players
Hamilton Red Wings (OHA) players
Ice hockey people from Ontario
Kansas City Blues players
EC KAC players
London Knights players
People from Cobourg
Philadelphia Firebirds (AHL) players
Philadelphia Firebirds (NAHL) players
Richmond Robins players
Saginaw Gears players
St. Louis Blues draft picks
St. Louis Blues players
Syracuse Firebirds players
Toledo Goaldiggers players
Washington Capitals players
Canadian expatriate ice hockey players in Austria